Amadou Doucoure (born 1919 in Goumbou, Mali, and died November 15, 1971 in Bamako) was a Malian politician who was elected to the French Senate in 1947.

References 

Malian politicians
French Senators of the Fourth Republic
1919 births
1971 deaths
People from Koulikoro Region
Senators of French Sudan